Charles Henry  Zercho (15 April 1866 – 30 March 1962) was an Australian Anglican minister, school principal, and Australian rules footballer.

Family
The son of Charles Henry Zercho (1866-1895), and Agnes Zercho (1841-1937), née Nicol, Charles Henry Zercho was born at Barkers Creek (near Castlemaine), Victoria, Australia on 15 April 1866.

He married Margaret Emma Clark (1876-1940) on 17 April 1900. They had five children: two daughters and three sons  a son (born 1910) was stillborn, and a daughter (born 1903), and a son (born 1905) each died within 6 months of their birth.

His brother, Frederick William Zercho (1867-1953), founded Zercho's Business College in 1906.

Education
He graduated Bachelor of Arts (BA) from the University of Melbourne on 13 April 1918.

Football
Recruited from Camberwell, he played with the Essendon Football Club, in the Victorian Football Association (VFA) in 1890; and, in the third quarter of his first senior match , against Geelong, at the East Melbourne Cricket Ground on 28 June 1890, he kicked Essendon's fourth and final goal for the match.

Cleric and educator
Over his lifetime he held numerous positions as a teacher, headmaster, priest, and as the minister of various parishes.

Death
He died in Murwillumbah, New South Wales, Australia on 30 March 1962.

Notes

References

 Maplestone, M., Flying Higher: History of the Essendon Football Club 1872–1996, Essendon Football Club, (Melbourne), 1996. 

1866 births
1962 deaths
Australian people of German descent
Australian people of Scottish descent
Australian rules footballers from Victoria (Australia)
Australian Rules footballers: place kick exponents
Essendon Football Club (VFA) players
Australian Anglican priests
Australian schoolteachers
Australian headmasters